Hulta is a settlement in Sävsjö Municipality, Jönköping County, Sweden.

References

Populated places in Jönköping County